Rodionovo-Nesvetaysky District is an administrative and municipal district (raion), one of the forty-three in Rostov Oblast, Russia. It is located in the west of the oblast. Its administrative center is the rural locality (a sloboda) of Rodionovo-Nesvetayskaya. Population: 23,632 (2010 Census);  The population of Rodionovo-Nesvetayskaya accounts for 27.0% of the district's total population.

Notable residents 

Aleksandr Rudenko, footballer, born 1999 in Daryevka

References

Notes

Sources

Districts of Rostov Oblast